Pierre Faber (born 29 March 1978) is a retired German international rugby union player, playing for the RG Heidelberg in the Rugby-Bundesliga and the German national rugby union team.

His last game for Germany was against Russia on 2 May 2009. Faber  ended his rugby career in December 2009.

Of French origin, Faber played rugby for Stade Dijonnais and RC Strasbourg before joining the RG Heidelberg in 2008 for his final rugby years.

Honours

National team
 European Nations Cup - Division 2
 Champions: 2008

Stats
Pierre Faber's personal statistics in club and international rugby:

Club

 As of 15 December 2010

National team

 As of 15 December 2010

References

External links
 Pierre Faber at scrum.com
   Pierre Faber at totalrugby.de

1978 births
Living people
German rugby union players
Germany international rugby union players
RG Heidelberg players
Rugby union props
German expatriate rugby union players
Expatriate rugby union players in France
German expatriate sportspeople in France